Hantson is a surname. Notable people with the surname include:

Ludwig N. Hantson (born 1962), Belgian businessman
Renaud Hantson (born 1963), French singer

See also
Hanson (surname)